This is a list of lighthouses in Bolivia.

Lighthouses

(*) SNHN (Servicio Nacional de Hidrografía Naval)

See also
 Lists of lighthouses and lightvessels

References

External links
 

Bolivia
Lighthouses
Lighthouses